Juan Gustavo Waldemar Morales (born 6 March 1989) is a Peruvian footballer who plays as a midfielder. He currently plays for Alianza Universidad in the Torneo Descentralizado.

Club career
Juan Morales joined the CD Universidad César Vallejo first team in January 2010. He had to wait until the last match of the 2010 season to make his league debut in the Torneo Descentralizado. Interim manager Benjamín Navarro included him in the starting eleven as his debut eventually finished in a 2–0 home win over FBC Melgar.

International career
Morales was called up for the first time to play for the Peru national team on 10 August 2012 in an upcoming friendly.

References

External links

1989 births
Living people
Peruvian footballers
Club Deportivo Universidad César Vallejo footballers
Juan Aurich footballers
Ayacucho FC footballers
Unión Comercio footballers
Alianza Universidad footballers
Peruvian Primera División players
Association football midfielders
Footballers at the 2015 Pan American Games
Pan American Games competitors for Peru